Kryštof Krýzl (born 12 October 1986) is a Czech alpine skier. Krýzl has appeared in the 2006 Winter Olympics in Turin, the 2010 Winter Olympics in Vancouver, the 2014 Winter Olympics in Sochi, the 2022 Winter Olympics in Beijing and at the 2005, 2007, 2011 and 2013 World Championships.

Career

World Cup
He made his World Cup debut in 2005 in Sölden, and since this date his best result is 9th, on 12 December 2008 in Val-d'Isère. In addition, he has finished in the top 20 eleven times (through 7 January 2017).

Season standings

Results per discipline

Standings through 2 February 2019

Olympic results

World Championship results

Winter Universiade results

References

External links
 
 

1986 births
Czech male alpine skiers
Alpine skiers at the 2006 Winter Olympics
Alpine skiers at the 2010 Winter Olympics
Alpine skiers at the 2014 Winter Olympics
Alpine skiers at the 2022 Winter Olympics
Olympic alpine skiers of the Czech Republic
Universiade medalists in alpine skiing
Sportspeople from Prague
Living people
Universiade silver medalists for the Czech Republic
Competitors at the 2013 Winter Universiade